Municipality of Guasave is a municipality in Sinaloa in northwestern Mexico. Its seat is Guasave city.

Political subdivision 
Guasave Municipality is subdivided in 12 sindicaturas:

References

Municipalities of Sinaloa